"No Hope" is a song by The Vaccines.

No Hope may also refer to:
hopelessness
 Literally, lack of hope
 "No Hope", a song by Red Fang from Whales and Leeches
No Hope, No Fear, the third album by Borghesia
No Hope, No Future, the second album by Good Shoes

See also
 Hopeless (disambiguation)
 Hope (disambiguation)